Clontarf Cricket Club is a cricket club in Dublin, Ireland, playing in Division 1 of the Leinster Senior League.  Based at Clontarf Cricket Club Ground, Castle Avenue, with a shared clubhouse, it also has playing facilities in the grounds of Mount Temple Comprehensive School.

History
The club was established in 1876, with its first ground off Vernon Avenue, then one near the meeting of the Howth Road with the coast road.  Clontarf Football Club, the local rugby union club, joined them in 1892, splitting the rent and with the two sports using the same field. The two clubs moved together to the present ground location, off Castle Avenue, in 1896. The club was initially solely a junior one, and won the Junior Cup final in 1898.

The club fielded its first international player in 1903, and senior status was attained in 1908. The club suspended operations for the four years from 1914. It won the Leinster Senior League in 1926.  Ladies cricket was begun in 1940, ceased in the early 1960s, and resumed in the mid-1970s.

In 1947, Clontarf Cricket Club and Clontarf Football Club (the local rugby union club) jointly purchased the Castle Avenue playing grounds, and where before 1947 the clubs shared the same field, from 1947 separate pitches were designated for cricket and rugby. At first the cricket club played nearer Castle Avenue, and the rugby club further away, but they later swapped playing areas. The ground is one of just three One-Day International grounds in Ireland.

People
 Louis Jacobson, batsman, played for Ireland, and was President of Clontarf from 1966-68.
 Noel Mahony, player, coach and administrator, also played rugby for Clontarf F.C.
 Alec O'Riordan, former international cricketer
 Andrew Poynter, former Irish international cricketer
 Deryck Vincent, Clontarf and Irish international cricketer

Honours
Irish Senior Cup: 1
2013
Leinster Senior League: 13
1926, 1961, 1972, 1991, 1992, 1995, 1996, 1999, 2000, 2007, 2009, 2015, 2016
Leinster Senior Cup: 14
1943, 1950, 1969, 1992, 1995, 2000, 2004, 2007, 2008, 2009, 2012, 2014, 2015, 2018

References

External links
Clontarf Cricket Club

Cricket clubs in County Dublin
Sports clubs in Dublin (city)
Cricket clubs established in 1876
1876 establishments in Ireland
Leinster Senior League (cricket) teams
Clontarf, Dublin